The 500 metres women's time trial at the 2006 Commonwealth Games was contested at the Melbourne Multi Purpose Venue on March 16, 2006.

Anna Meares of Australia won the gold medal.

Results

References

Track cycling at the 2006 Commonwealth Games
Cycling at the Commonwealth Games – Women's 500 m time trial
Comm